The 22nd Independent Spirit Awards, honoring the best independent films of 2006, were presented on February 24, 2007. The nominations were announced on November 28, 2006. Sarah Silverman returned as host for the second consecutive year.

Winners and nominees

{| class="wikitable"
! Best Feature
! Best Director
|-
| Little Miss Sunshine
 American Gun
 The Dead Girl
 Half Nelson
 Pan's Labyrinth
| Jonathan Dayton and Valerie Faris – Little Miss Sunshine
 Robert Altman – A Prairie Home Companion (posthumous)
 Ryan Fleck – Half Nelson
 Karen Moncrieff – The Dead Girl
 Steven Soderbergh – Bubble
|-
! Best Male Lead
! Best Female Lead
|-
| Ryan Gosling – Half Nelson
 Aaron Eckhart – Thank You for Smoking
 Edward Norton – The Painted Veil
 Ahmad Razvi – Man Push Cart
 Forest Whitaker – American Gun
| Shareeka Epps – Half Nelson
 Catherine O'Hara – For Your Consideration
 Elizabeth Reaser – Sweet Land
 Michelle Williams – Land of Plenty
 Robin Wright Penn – Sorry, Haters
|-
! Best Supporting Male
! Best Supporting Female
|-
| Alan Arkin – Little Miss Sunshine
 Raymond J. Barry – Steel City
 Daniel Craig – Infamous
 Paul Dano – Little Miss Sunshine
 Channing Tatum – A Guide to Recognizing Your Saints
| Frances McDormand – Friends with Money
 Melonie Diaz – A Guide to Recognizing Your Saints
 Marcia Gay Harden – American Gun
 Mary Beth Hurt – The Dead Girl
 Amber Tamblyn – Stephanie Daley
|-
! Best Screenplay
! Best First Screenplay
|-
| Thank You for Smoking – Jason Reitman Friends with Money – Nicole Holofcener
 The Illusionist – Neil Burger
 The Painted Veil – Ron Nyswaner
 Sorry, Haters – Jeff Stanzler
| Little Miss Sunshine – Michael Arndt Conversations with Other Women – Gabrielle Zevin
 A Guide to Recognizing Your Saints – Dito Montiel
 Half Nelson – Anna Boden and Ryan Fleck
 Wristcutters: A Love Story – Goran Dukić
|-
! Best First Feature
! Best Documentary Feature
|-
| Sweet Land
 Day Night Day Night
 Man Push Cart
 The Motel
 Wristcutters: A Love Story
| The Road to Guantánamo
 A Lion in the House
 My Country, My Country
 The Trials of Darryl Hunt
 You're Gonna Miss Me
|-
! Best Cinematography
! Best International Film
|-
| Pan's Labyrinth – Guillermo Navarro Brothers of the Head – Anthony Dod Mantle
 Four Eyed Monsters – Arin Crumley
 Man Push Cart – Michael Simmonds
 Wild Tigers I Have Known – Aaron Platt
| The Lives of Others • Germany 12:08 East of Bucharest • Romania
 The Blossoming of Maximo Oliveros • Philippines
 Chronicle of an Escape • Argentina
 Days of Glory • Algeria / Belgium / France / Morocco
|}

Films with multiple nominations and awards

Special awards

John Cassavetes AwardQuinceañera
 12 and Holding
 Chalk
 Four Eyed Monsters
 Old Joy

Truer Than Fiction Award
Adele Horne – The Tailenders
 Eric Daniel Metzgar – The Chances of the World Changing
 A. J. Schnack – Kurt Cobain: About a Son

Producers Award
Howard Gertler and Tim Perell – Pizza and Shortbus
 Julie Lynn – 10 Items or Less and Nine Lives
 Alex Orlovsky and Jamie Patricof – Half Nelson and Point&Shoot

Someone to Watch Award
Julia Loktev – Day Night Day Night
 So Yong Kim – In Between Days
 Richard Wong – Colma: The Musical

Robert Altman Award
 Robert Altman (posthumous)

Special Distinction Award
 Laura Dern and David Lynch ("in recognition of their unique and stunning collaborative work in the mesmerizing Inland Empire as well as the influential independent classics Blue Velvet and Wild at Heart")

References

External links
 2006 Spirit Awards at IMDb
 Official ceremony on YouTube

2006
Independent Spirit Awards